Sir Edward Youde  (Cantonese: Yau Tak; 19 June 1924 – 5 December 1986) was a British administrator, diplomat, and Sinologist. He served as Governor of Hong Kong between 20 May 1982, and his death on 5 December 1986.

Early years
Youde was born in Penarth, South Wales, in the United Kingdom and from 1942 attended the University of London's School of Oriental and African Studies. He also served in the Royal Naval Reserve.

Career
In 1947, Youde joined the Foreign Office, where he would serve the rest of his life, and was swiftly posted to the British embassy in Nanking, then the capital of the Republic of China. In 1949, amidst the Chinese Civil War, HMS Amethyst came under attack by People's Liberation Army forces while sailing on the Yangtze River. The frigate was heavily damaged by artillery fire and became stranded in the Yangtze River. Using his skills in Mandarin, Youde negotiated with the PLA commander to ask for the release of the Amethyst. His negotiations came to naught, but bought enough time for the Amethyst to plan a successful escape to Hong Kong under the cover of darkness. Youde was appointed a Member of the Order of the British Empire (MBE) for his actions.

In 1950, following the Communists' victory in the civil war, Britain recognised the People's Republic of China, and the British embassy moved to Beijing. Youde went on to serve a total of four tours of Foreign Office duty in China, the last as ambassador, from 1974 to 1978.  He also served in Washington (1956 to 1959) and as a member of the British mission to the United Nations (1965 to 1969).

Youde was knighted in 1977.

Hong Kong governorship
Youde is especially remembered for his tenure as the Hong Kong Governor and his role in negotiating the Sino-British Joint Declaration, which was signed in Beijing in 1984. This, among other things, made it clear the British would leave Hong Kong in 1997 after 156 years of colonial rule.

Hong Kong's only Welsh Governor was widely liked for his kindly demeanour and greatly admired for his formidable erudition. In an editorial following his death, the Chinese-language Ming Pao newspaper compared him to Zhuge Liang, a chancellor of the state of Shu Han during the Three Kingdoms period, who had 'pledged to work diligently on state affairs until death'.

The idea of setting up a secondary school to develop students' potential in sport and the visual arts together with a normal academic syllabus was first mooted by Youde. Based upon this idea, the Jockey Club Ti-I College was founded in 1989.

Death and state funeral
During a visit to Beijing, Youde suffered a fatal heart attack in the British Embassy in the early hours of 5 December 1986, while asleep. He was the only Governor of Hong Kong to die in office.

At his funeral - Hong Kong's first state funeral with full military honours - the streets were lined with people. Youde was cremated, and his ashes buried at Canterbury Cathedral in England, where a memorial plaque to him was installed in the nave.

Remembrance and legacy
A fund, the Sir Edward Youde Memorial Fund, was created from public contributions upon the recommendation of the Legislative Council. The fund is now administered by the HKSAR Government and offers a number of scholarships and sponsorship schemes aimed at encouraging and promoting the education of and research by Hong Kong people. To be eligible for the Sir Edward Youde Memorial Fund, candidates must be proficient in English and Chinese and also have a good mastery of the language in which their studies will be undertaken.

The Edward Youde Aviary in Hong Kong Park was named after him in 1992, in recognition of his birdwatching interest. The Pamela Youde Nethersole Eastern Hospital in Hong Kong was named after his wife.

A plaque to his memory was commissioned by the Hong Kong Civil Service and placed on the wall of St John's Cathedral, in the Central District of Hong Kong.

Personal and family
Youde married Pamela Fitt and the couple had two daughters, Jennifer and Deborah.

References

External links

 
 5 December 1986 - TVB Pearl News File report on Sir Edward Youde's death
 Corpus of Political Speeches Free access to political speeches by Edward Youde and other politicians, developed by Hong Kong Baptist University Library

1924 births
1986 deaths
Alumni of SOAS University of London
Governors of Hong Kong
Knights Grand Cross of the Order of St Michael and St George
Knights Grand Cross of the Royal Victorian Order
Members of the Order of the British Empire
British sinologists
Ambassadors of the United Kingdom to China
People from Penarth
HK LegCo Members 1985–1988
20th-century British historians
20th-century Hong Kong people
20th-century British politicians
Burials at Canterbury Cathedral
Royal Naval Reserve personnel